Karl Tausig (sometimes "Carl"; born Karol Tausig; 4 November 184117 July 1871) was a Polish virtuoso pianist, arranger and composer. He is generally regarded as Franz Liszt's most esteemed pupil, and one of the greatest pianists of all time.

Life
Tausig was born in Warsaw to Jewish parents and received his first piano lessons from his father, pianist and composer Aloys Tausig, a student of Sigismond Thalberg. His father introduced him to Franz Liszt in Weimar at the age of 14. He quickly became a favorite pupil of Liszt's, travelling with him on concert tours and studying counterpoint, composition and orchestration in addition to his piano lessons, and even taking on one of Liszt's pupils, Regina Watson, as his own. At the age of 16 he met Richard Wagner, of whom he became a devoted follower and friend. He also became a great admirer and friend of Johannes Brahms. Tausig made piano arrangements of many of Wagner's operas. He also introduced to Wagner his friend Peter Cornelius, another Wagner devotee.

In 1858 Tausig made his debut in Berlin at a concert conducted by Hans von Bülow. While some critics admired his technical feats at the keyboard, others found his playing noisy and overbearing. Even some who were more accommodating of Tausig's "Lisztian eccentricities" felt he would play better as he matured. Tausig toured through various German towns in 1859–60, making Dresden his base. He moved to Vienna in 1862; there he gave concerts of modern orchestral music, including some of his own symphonic poems. These concerts were only partially successful artistically and a failure financially. After staying out of public view for a few years, during which time he married pianist Seraphine von Vrabely (1841–1931), he began touring once again and was now considered a pianist of breadth and dignity of style.

Tausig settled in Germany and opened a piano school in Berlin in 1865 which, however, closed soon afterwards. He toured throughout Europe, but the strain of travelling weakened his health. He died in Leipzig from typhoid at the age of 29. His grave is preserved in the Protestant Friedhof III der Jerusalems- und Neuen Kirchengemeinde (Cemetery No. III of the congregations of Jerusalem's Church and New Church) in Berlin-Kreuzberg, south of Hallesches Tor.

Pianism
Tausig was considered by some critics to be the greatest of Liszt's pupils, pianistically speaking, and to carry pure virtuosity to heights only suggested by Liszt. Anton Rubinstein called him "the infallible." Where Tausig differed from his teacher was in his lack of flamboyant gestures while playing. Tausig sat motionless at the piano and abhorred what he called Spektakel. While his fingers were working miracles at the keyboard without any digital errors, the only sign of tension from Tausig would be a slight tightening of one corner of his mouth.

Until his untimely death, some critics surmise that Tausig may not have had a pianistic equal, combining Liszt's force and range of tone color with the intellectuality of his fellow pupil Hans von Bülow. Another Liszt pupil, Eugen d'Albert, compared Tausig very favorably with their teacher. He said that while Liszt's musical conceptions were grander, Tausig possessed a better and more accurate technique coupled with a good deal of poetry.

Repertory
Tausig's repertory was extensive; he could play from memory works ranging from Scarlatti to Liszt. He was especially noted for his interpretations of Chopin, Weber and Beethoven, both for pianistic finish and intensity of emotion.

Works

Karl Tausig's output as composer is quite small. As well as entirely original works, he arranged for piano the music of a number of composers, as well as a pedagogic work for teaching and practice.

In the following list, lost works are included, mostly original compositions, but a few transcriptions as well. Many of these, including several orchestral works, were given their first public performances by Tausig at the piano or conducting. With the exception of Das Geisterschiff, the orchestral scores have not been located since. All of these are unpublished, except for a couple compositions where no printed copies can be found and the original engravings were destroyed.

Some compositions are unfinished in existing manuscripts, left incomplete by Tausig for reasons unknown, most particularly a number of the transcriptions of Liszt's symphonic poems. Where possible, details of the state of the manuscript are given.

All works listed are for piano solo unless indicated otherwise.

Original compositions

Early works

 Impromptu, in F minor, Op. 1 [1a] (c1850-55)
 Introduction and Tarantella, in A minor, Op. 2 [2a] (c1850-55)
 L'Éspérance (Hope), Nocturne varié, in A-flat major, Op. 3 [3a] (c1850-56)
 Sérénade, Op. 4 [publication lost] (c1850-56)
 Rêverie, Fantasie, in A major, Op. 5 (c1850-56)
 Le Ruisseau (The Brook), Etude, in A major, Op. 6 (c1850-56)

Mature works

 Das Geisterschiff, Ballade (piano version) (The Ghost Ship), in A minor/D major, Op. 1 [1b] (c1858-60)
 Réminiscences de Halka, Op. 2 [2b] (c1858-60) [see Paraphrases section]
 Hernani-Galop, Op. 3 [3b] [lost] (c1858-60)
 Das Geisterschiff, Symphonische Ballade, for orchestra (The Ghost Ship, Symphonic Ballad based on a poem by Strachwitz) [ms found] (c1862-63)
 Manfred, symphonic poem for orchestra (after Byron) [lost] (c1862-63)
 Der Triumph der Liebe, symphonic poem for orchestra with chorus and soloists on text by Schiller [only 1 page found, remainder lost] (c1862-63)
 Der Triumph der Liebe (piano version) [only 1 page found, remainder lost] (c1862-63)
 One or more other symphonic poems for orchestra [all lost] (c1862-63)
 Fantaisie in polonaise style, for piano and orchestra, (sometimes erroneously called a Concerto or a Polonaise) [lost] (c1862-63)
 Five Nouvelles soirées de Vienne (1862-63) [see Paraphrases section]
 Ungarische Zigeunerweisen (Hungarian Gypsy Airs) (Fantasia on Hungarian-Gypsy Themes), in B minor/major (written for and dedicated to his Hungarian pianist wife Seraphine von Vrabely) (1864)
 Tägliche Studien für Pianoforte von Tausig-Ehrlich (Tausig's Daily Exercises for Piano) (c1864-70?) [published 1873] [American revised edition with additional exercises by Heinrich Ehrlich published 1880]:
 Vol. 1:
 Exercises with motionless hands. (#1–26)
 Exercises with the hands in progressive motion. Turning the fingers over and under. (#27–51)
 Vol. 2:
 Studies in Chords. (#52–68)
 Stretching exercises. (#69–76)
 Wide Jumps. (#77–84)
 Double-Notes. (#85–100)
 Scales in thirds in all major and minor keys. Chromatic scales with double-notes. (#101–102)
 Six Exercise Pieces. [called Préludes in the American revised edition (with 4 additional Préludes by "H. Ehrlich")]:
 No. 103: Moderato in E-flat minor
 No. 104: Allegro in E-flat major
 No. 105: Allegro moderato in C minor
 No. 106: Allegro in A major
 No. 107: Andante in F-sharp major
 No. 108: Moderato in D-flat major
 Octave-exercise. (#109)

Late works

 Deux Études de concert (Two Concert Etudes), Op.1 [1c] [published 1871] (c1870-71):
 No. 1: Presto appassionato in F-sharp major
 No. 2: Moderato in A-flat major

Paraphrases, fantasies, elaborations

 Berlioz: Gnomenchor und Sylphentanz, aus Fausts Verdammung (from the Damnation of Faust, Op. 24)
 Brahms: Variations on a Theme of Paganini (Op. 35), manuscript sketches elaborated on (given a more virtuosic flavor) by Tausig and returned to Brahms for completion (c1862-63)
 Chopin: Étude (Op. 10 No. 2) [reconstructed] (c1862-63)
 Chopin: Étude (Op. 25 No. 2), transcription in double notes (sixths and thirds in the right hand) [lost?] (c1862-63)
 Clementi: Gradus ad Parnassum (Op. 44), selection of studies "revised" by Tausig
 Moniuszko: Réminiscences de Halka, de St. Moniuszko. Fantaisie de concert, (Fantasie Halka. Oper von Moniuszko) (Concert Fantasy (Fantasia) on Themes from the Opera 'Halka' by Moniusko), Op. 2 [2b] (c1858-60)
 Schumann: Der Kontrabandiste (The Smuggler), from Spanisches Liederspiel (Op. 74 No. 10), "transcribed for concert performance"
 Strauss: Nouvelles soirées de Vienne: Valses-Caprices d'après J. Strauss (Valses Caprices on Themes of Johann Strauss Jr.) (Waltz-Caprices Nos. 1–3 [First Suite]) (dedicated to Liszt) (1862):
 No. 1: Nachtfalter (Moth Waltzes, Op. 157)
 No. 2: Man lebt nur einmal (You Live Only Once!, Waltzes, Op. 167)
 No. 3: Wahlstimmen (Election Waltzes, Op. 250)
 Strauss: Nouvelles soirées de Vienne: Valses-Caprices d'après J. Strauss (Valses Caprices on Themes of Johann Strauss Jr.) (Waltz-Caprices Nos. 4 and 5 [Second Suite, posth.]) (1862-63):
 No. 4: Immer heiterer (Always Cheerful Waltzes, Op. 235)
 No. 5: Wiener Chronik, in A major (Vienna Chronicle Waltzes, Op. 268)
 Wagner: Vorspiel (Prelude) to Die Meistersinger von Nürnberg, for solo piano
 Wagner: Vorspiel (Prelude) to Die Meistersinger von Nürnberg, for piano four-hands
 Wagner: Meditation, Einleitung zum dritten akt (Introduction to the 3rd act) of Die Meistersinger von Nürnberg
 Wagner: Two "Free Transcriptions" from Die Walküre:
 Siegmunds Liebesgesang (Siegmund's Love Song)
 Der Ritt der Walküren (The Ride of the Valkyries)
 Wagner: Der Ritt der Walküren von Richard Wagner, for piano four-hands
 Wagner: Tristan und Isolde, Drei Paraphrasen (3 Paraphrases on Wagner's opera) (c1865):
 No. 1: Liebesscene - Verklärung (Love Scene & Transfiguration)
 No. 2: Brangänens Gesang - Matrosenlied (Brangäne's Song & Sailors Shanty)
 No. 3: Melodie des Hirten (The Sheep Herders Melody)
 Wagner: Kaiser-Marsch (WWV 104)
 Weber: Aufforderung zum Tanz, Mit Arabesken für den Concertvortrag (Invitation to the Dance, Op. 65), "with arabesques for concert performance", concert arrangement for piano

Transcriptions, adaptations, piano scores, editions

 Bach: Toccata und Fuge in D minor (BWV 565), transcription for piano ("concert arrangement") (c1862-63)
 Bach: Sechs Choralvorspiele für Orgel (6 Chorale Preludes), transcriptions for piano (dedicated to Brahms) (c1862-63):
 No. 1: Wir glauben all' an einen Gott, Schöpfer (BWV 680)
 No. 2: Das alte Jahr vergangen ist (BWV 614)
 No. 3: O Mensch, bewein' dein' Sünde gross (BWV 622)
 No. 4: O Lamm Gottes, unschuldig (BWV 656)
 No. 5: Vater unser im Himmelreich (BWV 737)
 No. 6: Meine Seele erhebt den Herren (BWV 648)
 Bach: Praeludium, Fuge und Allegro in E-flat major (BWV 998), transcription for piano (c1862-63)
 Bach: Well Tempered Clavier, selections edited and fingering by Tausig
 Beethoven: Sechs Sätze aus Streichquartetten (6 Pieces from String Quartets), transcriptions for piano:
 No. 1: Adagio (Op. 59 No. 1, 3rd mvt)
 No. 2: Scherzo (Op. 59 No. 2, 3rd mvt)
 No. 3: Andante (Op. 59 No. 3, 2nd mvt)
 No. 4: Kavatine (Cavatina) (Op. 130, 5th mvt)
 No. 5: Presto (Op. 131, 5th mvt)
 No. 6: Scherzo (Op. 135, 2nd mvt)
 Beethoven: Missa solemnis (Op. 123), piano reduction [reconstructed]
 Beethoven: Sechs Minuetten (WoO 10), arranged from Beethoven's unpublished orchestral manuscript (since lost)
 Beethoven: Piano Concerto No. 4 (Op. 58), transcription for piano solo, and edited and fingering by Tausig
 Chopin: Piano Concerto No. 1 in E minor (Op. 11), transcription for solo piano (c1865?)
 Chopin: Piano Concerto No. 2 in F minor (Op. 21), 2nd movement, transcription for solo piano [reconstructed]
 Clementi: Gradus ad Parnassum (Op. 44), edited and fingering by Tausig [see also selections in Paraphrase section]
 Lassen: Albumleaf [incomplete]
 Liszt: Faust-Symphonie [2nd movement 'Gretchen' incomplete, remainder mostly complete; reconstructed]
 Liszt: Dante-Symphonie [unpublished]
 Liszt: 12 Symphonic Poems, transcriptions for piano (1855-71):
 No. 1: Ce qu'on entend sur la montagne [unpublished]
 No. 2: Tasso [essentially complete, only last 4 bars not finished, ms in Library of Congress; ending reconstructed]
 No. 3: Les préludes [published by Editio Musica Budapest]
 No. 4: Orpheus [no phrasing, dynamics or tempo markings; unpublished]
 No. 5: Prometheus [reconstructed]
 No. 6: Mazeppa [lost, possibly never written]
 No. 7: Festklänge [unfinished; 3/4 reconstructed]
 No. 8: Heroïde funèbre [no phrasing, dynamics or tempo markings; unpublished]
 No. 9: Hungaria [last 13 bars incomplete; unpublished]
 No. 10: Hamlet [unpublished]
 No. 11: Hunnenschlacht [reconstructed]
 No. 12: Die Ideale [last 25 bars incomplete; unpublished]
 Scarlatti: Five Sonatas, "concert arrangements" for piano from the original harpsichord pieces:
 No. 1: Pastorale (in E minor K. 9), transposed to D minor
 No. 2: Capriccio (in E major K. 20)
 No. 3: (in G minor K. 12)
 No. 4: (in G minor K. 426)
 No. 5: (in F minor K. 519)
 Scarlatti: Keyboard Sonata in C major (K. 487)
 Schubert: Militär-Marsch (Military March) No. 1 in D (Op. 51 No. 1), transcription for solo piano ("concert arrangement")
 Schubert: Andantino und Variationen (Andantino and Variations) & Rondo, über französische Motive (Rondo, on a French Theme) (Op. 84 Nos. 1–2), transcriptions for solo piano ("concert arrangement")
 Schubert: Polonaise mélancolique d'après F. Schubert (Op. 75 No. 3), transcription for solo piano
 Wagner: Die Meistersinger von Nürnberg, piano reduction of complete orchestral score, with vocal score [see also selections in Paraphrase section]

Wrongly attributed works

 "Morgenblätter", Walzer von J. Strauss Op. 279 – Paraphrasiert für den Concert Vortrag von Karl Tausig – Oeuvre Posthume [published c1878; actually composed by American pianist Julie Rivé-King (1854-1937)]
 "Kiss Waltz", Walzer von J. Strauss [recorded by Benno Moiseiwitsch; actually composed by Russian composer and pianist Eduard Schütt (1856-1933) as "Concert Paraphrases on J. Strauss' Waltz Motives"]

Recordings

Michael Ponti was the first to record an all-Tausig album, in the 1970s on the Candide LP label. Beginning in 1989, Dennis Hennig released three all-Tausig albums for the Etcetera label: all five of the Valse-Caprices and the three Schubert transcriptions, an album of Tausig's Wagner transcriptions including the four-hand version of Ride of the Valkyres, and four of Tausig's transcriptions of Liszt symphonic poems. Orazio Sciortino made an album of the Wagner transcriptions as well in 2013. Artur Cimirro recorded Tausig's complete original piano works for the Acte Préalable CD label in 2016.

Many other modern-day pianists have recorded Tausig compositions, such as Rian de Waal, Giulio Draghi, Stephen Hough, and Menachem Har-Zahav. There are several recordings of Tausig's piano music on YouTube. Setrak Setrakian has recorded the rare Chopin E minor concerto transcription.

Historically, Tausig's arrangement of Strauss's waltz You Only Live Once! was recorded by Sergei Rachmaninov and Ignacy Jan Paderewski. Rachmaninov also made recordings of Tausig's transcription of Schumann's Der Kontrabandiste (also recorded by Josef Lhévinne, Josef Hofmann, and Emil Gilels) and Tausig's Pastorale in E minor, adaptated from Scarlatti's harpsichord Sonata, L. 413, the latter also being popular with several other pianists of that era, including Vladimir Horowitz. The Bach Toccata and Fugue in D minor adaptation and the Schubert/Tausig Marche Militaire were also quite popular in recordings, the latter being recorded by Eugen d'Albert, Leopold Godowsky, Mischa Levitzki, Lhévinne, Ignaz Friedman, Egon Petri, Wilhelm Backhaus, Alexander Brailowsky, Horowitz, and György Cziffra. Most of those pianists recorded other Tausig works as well, such as Lhévinne's rare recording of the Hungarian Gypsy Dances. Benno Moiseiwitsch recorded Tausig's piano arrangement of Weber's orchestral Invitation to the Dance. Winifred Christie even recorded the Bach Toccata and Fugue in D minor adaptation on her husband's invention, the Moór-Duplex piano.

Notes

References
 Dannreuther, Edward, ed. Stanley Sadie, "Tausig, Carl [Karol]," The New Grove Dictionary of Music and Musicians, Second Edition, 29 vols. (London: Macmillan, 2001). .
 Schonberg, Harold C., The Great Pianists (New York: Simon & Schuster, 1987, 1963). .
 Mephistopheles on Parnasus - The Life of Carl Tausig - 1841-1871. by Artur Cimirro. (2010)
 Unknown composer #3: Carl Tausig Articles by pianist Artur Cimirro: Biography (excerpts 2010), List of Works (updated 2017), Some recordings.
 Karol Tausig Older composition list (2016) by Artur Cimirro, but with more details; Some more recordings.

External links
 
 
 Karl Tausig (Piano) Bach Cantatas Website
 Isidore Singer, Joseph Sohn: Tausig, Carl Jewish Encyclopedia
 James M. Tracy: The Etudes in The World's Greatest Pianists''
 
 
 Scores by Karl Tausig in digital library Polona

1841 births
1871 deaths
19th-century classical composers
19th-century classical pianists
19th-century Polish composers
Polish Romantic composers
Polish classical pianists
Male classical pianists
19th-century Polish Jews
Jewish classical composers
Jewish classical musicians
Jewish classical pianists
Pupils of Franz Liszt
19th-century male musicians
Musicians from Warsaw